Balltorps FF is a Swedish football club located in Mölndal.

Background
Balltorps FF currently plays in Division 5 Göteborg B which is the seventh tier of Swedish football. They play their home matches at the Förbovallen in Mölndal.

The club is affiliated to Göteborgs Fotbollförbund.

The first team and group of senior players was founded as late as 2005 but is now considered as well established in the regional football leagues.

With good management and administrative people in the management Balltorps FF is well known as a great platform for players in and around the Gothenburg area, either for further development or taking a step down the tiers.

Current manager of the 2014 season is Erik Börjesson and Jim Holmelin.

Season to season

Footnotes

External links
 Balltorps FF – Official website
 Balltorps FF on Facebook

Balltorp FF
Association football clubs established in 1988
1988 establishments in Sweden
Football clubs in Västra Götaland County